Darragh Ennis is an Irish entomologist, neuroscientist, quizzer, and television personality. He is a postdoctoral researcher at the University of Oxford and is known as one of the "chasers" on the ITV game show The Chase.

Early life and science career 
Ennis was born in Dublin, and grew up in Rathcoole. He studied at Maynooth University, graduating with a BSc in biology in 2002, and a PhD in ecology in 2008. After completing his doctorate, he worked as a biomedical scientist at ICON for a year before undertaking postdoctoral research at Concordia University in Montreal, Canada, from 2010 until 2012. Since 2013, he has worked as a laboratory manager and research technician in the Department of Biochemistry at the University of Oxford, where he specialises in researching the brains of insects.

Television 
In 2015, Ennis appeared as a contestant on the game show Rebound, but was eliminated in the "Stop the Bar" round.

In 2017, Ennis was a member of a winning team on The Chase. He earned £9,000 in his Cash Builder round and defeated chaser Paul Sinha to take this money into the Final Chase. The other three contestants also advanced, but each of them took low offers from Sinha so that the final prize total was £6,300. Outraged viewers set up a GoFundMe campaign to compensate Ennis for his share of the money lost through his teammates' decisions. Ennis requested for all money to be donated to charity.

In April 2020, Ennis was announced as the sixth chaser on The Chase, alongside Mark Labbett, Shaun Wallace, Anne Hegerty, Paul Sinha and Jenny Ryan. His Chaser-debut episode was aired on 19 November 2020. His debut brought in 4.9 million viewers, making it the most watched episode of The Chase ever.

Personal life 

Ennis lives in Oxford with his wife, a fellow scientist whom he met at Maynooth, and their two children.

Ennis speaks fluent Irish and German, in addition to English. A former Gaelic footballer, he is a founding member of Oxford GAA, and serves as the club's registrar. He supports Dublin GAA and Liverpool FC.

Filmography

References

External links 
 

1980 births
Living people
Irish expatriates in England
Irish entomologists
Irish neuroscientists
Irish television personalities
Alumni of Maynooth University
Academic staff of Concordia University
Academics of the University of Oxford
Contestants on British game shows